Shinny  is an informal type of ice hockey.

Shinny may also refer to:

People
Shinny Bayaar (born 1977), Mongolian professional boxer
Tom Shinny (born 1899), an Irish hurler

Other uses
Shinney, a North American game played with a buffalo-hair ball
Moonshine, high-proof distilled spirits, generally produced illicitly
 A variant of mini hockey played indoors on one's knees

See also
Andrew Shinnie, (born 1989), Scottish professional footballer
Shinty,  a Scottish team game played with sticks and a ball
Pond hockey, a form of ice hockey